Arnoldo Parés  (born 1922) is an Argentine boxer  who competed in the 1948 Summer Olympics in the bantamweight, he beat Vic Toweel in the first round on points, but then lost to British boxer Jimmy Carruthers on points.

References

External links
 

1922 births
Possibly living people
Bantamweight boxers
Olympic boxers of Argentina
Boxers at the 1948 Summer Olympics
Argentine male boxers